Khaled Habib Al-Waheebi (born 1 December 1970) is a Qatari footballer. He competed in the men's tournament at the 1992 Summer Olympics.

References

External links
 

1970 births
Living people
Qatari footballers
Qatar international footballers
Olympic footballers of Qatar
Al Sadd SC players
Al-Wakrah SC players
Qatar Stars League players
Footballers at the 1992 Summer Olympics
Place of birth missing (living people)
Association football forwards